Raúl Marcelino Alfaro Torres (born June 10, 1933, in Santiago de Cuba Cuba) is a Cuban artist specializing in engraving, photography, sculpture, drawing, painting and graphic design.

Alfaro graduated from the "Escuela Provincial de Artes Plásticas José Joaquín Tejada", in Santiago de Cuba in 1952. He later studied arts and graphic design from 1957 to 1958 at the School of Visual Arts/American Art School in New York City.

Individual exhibitions
1965 – "Alfaro. Grabados y Dibujos", Galería de Oriente, Santiago de Cuba
1965 – "Pintores y Grabadores de Santiago. Aguilera y Alfaro". Centro de Arte Internacional, in Havana.
 Galería Espacio Abierto, Revista Revolución y Cultura, Havana, Cuba
 "Exposición del Mtro. Raúl Alfaro Torres. Colografías" Havana, Cuba
 Galería de la Casa Makuixóchitl, Ocotepec, Morelos, México.

Collective exhibitions
 1963 – "Salón Nacional de Grabado 1963", Museo Nacional de Bellas Artes de La Habana
 1964 – "Tercer Concurso Latinoamericano de Grabado", Galería Latinoamericana, Casa de las Américas (Havana)
 1982 – "Pintores Santiagueros de Cuba", Galería Tierra Adentro 2, Mexico City, México.

Awards
1963 – Acquisition Award. Salón Nacional de Grabado 1963, Museo Nacional de Bellas Artes de La Habana
1970 – Acquisition Award. "Salón 70", Museo Nacional de Bellas Artes de La Habana
1976 – First Prize in Engraving; Primer Salón del Nuevo Paisaje, Santiago de Cuba

Collections
His works are part of the permanent collections:
Museo Bacardí in Santiago de Cuba
Museo Nacional de Bellas Artes de La Habana

References
 Judith Bettelheim; AfroCuba: Works on Paper, 1968–2003; San Francisco State University Gallery; 2005;

External links

 El Habanero website

1933 births
Living people
Cuban contemporary artists
Cuban painters
Modern painters